This is a list of vacuum cleaners and vacuum cleaner manufacturers. A vacuum cleaner is a device that uses an air pump to create a partial vacuum to suck up dust and dirt, usually from floors, and optionally from other surfaces as well. The dirt is collected by either a dustbag or a rigid cartridge, which may be emptied and reused. Vacuum cleaners are used in homes as well as in industry, and exist in a variety of sizes and models.

Vacuum cleaners

Robotic vacuum cleaners

A robotic vacuum cleaner is an autonomous robotic vacuum cleaner that has intelligent programming and a limited vacuum cleaning system. Some designs use spinning brushes to reach tight corners.  Others combine a number of cleaning features (mopping, UV sterilization, etc.) simultaneous to vacuuming, thus rendering the machine into more than just a robot "vacuum" cleaner.

Manufacturers and specific models include:

 ANABAS SZ-200,SZ-300,SZ-350
 AUTOBOT RC530R
 Bissell SmartClean Robot
 Braava mopping robot, known as "Mint" before iRobot's acquisition of Evolution Robotics
 Dustbot
 Dyson 360 eye, 360 Heurist
 Ecovacs Robotics
 Electrolux Trilobite
 Eufy
 Fuji and Sumitomo Office area cleaning robot system
 ILIFE
 Iris Ohyama RBC-28
 Kärcher RC3000
 Koolvac
 LG Roboking
 Miele
 Neato Robotics
 Orazio (vacuum cleaner) by Zuchetti
 PicaBot by Corvan
 Roborock
 Roomba by iRobot
 Russell Hobbs
 Samsung POWERbot
Shark IQ
 CCP SO-Zi CZ-903-WH
 Toshiba
 Tsukamoto Aim ecomo AIM-ROBO1
 Vorwerk Kobold

Upright vacuum cleaners 
Upright vacuum cleaners are an "all-in-one" unit, with the motor, dust collector, and cleaning head are all attached.

Bagless 

 Dirt Devil Vision
 BISSELL BGU1451T
 Shark Navigator Series (NV1xx, NV2xx)
 Dyson Ball
 Vax Mach Air
 Vax Airlift
 Shark Rotator Series (NV3xx, NV4xx, NV5xx, NV6xx, NV7xx)
 Shark Apex Series (AZ1xxx)
 Shark Vertex Series (AZ2xxx)
 Vax Air Stretch
 Vax Air Reach, Pet, Pets and Family, total home
 Hoover Windtunnel Bagless

Bagged 

 Hoover Windtunnel Bagged

Stick vacuum cleaners 
Stick vacuum cleaners are a lighter and sleeker variety of upright vacuum cleaners, typically with no bag. Models include:

Bagless 

 Bissell Featherweight
 Eureka Superbroom
 Shark Rocket series 
 Dyson V-series (V6, V7, V8, V10, V11,V12,V15)
 Hoover Quik Broom

Bagged 

 Hoover Windtunnel
 Hoover Elite 
 Hoover Convertible
 Hoover Tempo

Canister vacuum cleaners 
Canister vacuum cleaners separate their motor and dust collection system. These two components are frequently connected by a hose.

Bagless 

 Dyson Big Ball

Bagged 
 Kenmore Progressive 
 Panasonic MC-CG902
 Oreck XL2100RHS

Handheld vacuum cleaners 
Handheld vacuum cleaners typically do not have a bag, rather most have a cup or cylinder for dust collection.

 Shark Wandvac
 Vax Blade

Vacuum cleaner manufacturers

 Advance
 AEG
 Aerus, LLC
 Airflo
 Akai
  Alfred Karcher GmbH & Co KG
  ANABAS (Tachi Holdings)
  Anko (Kmart Australia)
  AUTOBOT (Robot Maker Co., Ltd. - Bangkok, Thailand)
  AutoBot (car vacuums)
  Bauer
  Betco
 Bissell
 Black and Decker
 Botslab
  Brady Industries
  Braun
  Breville (handheld)
 BSH Bosch und Siemens Hausgeräte
 Cana-Vac
 Clarke
 Cleva
 Comet
 Corvan
 CCP
 Daewoo
 DeLonghi
 Dewalt
 Dirt Devil - Royal Appliance Mfg (now TTI Floor Care North America Techtronic Industries)
 Diversey
 Dreame Technology
  Dustbane Products Ltd
  Dustbot
 Dyson
 Easy Home (Aldi)
Ecovacs Robotics
Eltrex Industries
 Electrolux Home Care Products NA 
 Eufy 
 Eureka 
 Evolution Robotics 
 Ezymount
  Fairfax
  FilterQueen
  Frantz Premier
  Fujihama
  Garry Vacuum, LLC
  GE
  GEC
  Ghibli & Wirbel
 Goblin Vacuum Cleaners
 Gtech
  Haier
  Hako
 Hecht
  Hawk Enterprises
  Hilti
  Hisense
  Hitachi (or Hi Koki)
  Hoover Company (currently Techtronic Industries)
  Hotpoint
  H-P Products
  Husqvarna
  Hyundai
  ILIFE (Shenzhen Zhiyi Technology Co., Ltd.)
  Iris Ohyama
 iRobot
 i-Vac
 Jetwave
 Kärcher
 Kawasaki
 Kenmore (brand)
 Kenwood
 Kent RO Systems
 Kerrick
 Kirby Company
 Kogan (store brand)
 Končar
 Koolvac
 Living & Co (The Warehouse Group)
 LG
 Makita
 Maytag
 Menalux
 Metabo
 MetroVac
 Miele
 Milwaukee
 Mistral
 Mitsubishi Electric
 Morphy Richards
 Neato Robotics
 Nilfisk-Advance
 Numatic International
 Optim
 Oreck Corporation (part of TTI Floor Care North America)
 Ozito
 Pacvac
 Paddock
 Panasonic
 Philips
 Powr-Flite
  ProTeam (Emerson)
  Pullman
 Rexair
 Riccar
 Ridgid
 Roborock
 Royal Appliance Manufacturing
 Rubbermaid Commercial Products LLC
 Russell Hobbs
 Ryobi
 Sauber
 Samsung
 Sanitaire
 Sanyo
 Schneider Consumer
 Sebo
 SharkNinja Operating LLC, marketing products under the Shark brands for vacuums.
 Sharp
 Shop-Vac
 Silent Master
 SKIL
 Sona (Cahaya Electronics Pte Ltd, Singapore)
 Stanley (Black & Decker)
 Stihl
 Stirling (ALDI)
 Subaru (Fuji Heavy Industries) and Sumitomo (jointy developed Floor Cleaning Robot)
 Tacony Corporation (Carpet Pro, CFR, Clean Max, Fuller Brush, Maytag Vacuums, Simplicity, Tornado, Vac Pro)
 Taski
 Techtronic Industries Co. Ltd. & TTI Floor Care Technology Ltd.
 Tineco
 Titan
 Toolpro
 Toshiba
 Trifo
  Tristar / Compact (brand) www.tristarclean.com
  Tsukamoto Aim
 Tubò (company)
 Unimac
 Vac-Tric (Cricklewood, London, defunct)
 Vax UK ltd.
 Verdex
 Victa Vac (outdoor vacuums)
 Victor (IIC Products Ltd)
 Volta (Electrolux)
 Vorwerk (company)
 Vyking Force
 Wagan
 Wertheim (company)
 Western Electric
 Westinghouse
 Whirlpool Corporation (Hoover (before 2007))
 Work Hero
 Workzone
  Yujin Robot (iClebo)
 Zanussi
 Zuchetti (Robot Orazio)

See also

 Comparison of domestic robots
 Domestic robot
 Home appliance
 Hubert Cecil Booth – invented the first powered vacuum cleaner
 List of home appliances
 List of home automation topics
 Suction excavator

References

External links
 
 
 

Vacuum cleaners
Lists of manufacturers
Technology-related lists